Farouq Abul-Aziz (born July 24, 1946 at El-Mahalla El-Kubra, in the heartland of Egypt's Nile Delta) is a well known TV presenter, interviewer, writer, producer and director in the Arab World.

Career
The career of Farouk Abdulaziz had been quite multi-foliate since its inception some 45 years ago. Before obtaining his BA degree in English literature from the Faculty of Arts in Cairo University, he was involved in writing comic strips for Disney's Middle East Arabic language franchise; the weekly Mickey where he published his noted one-year-long series The Gates of Cairo (1967–1968).

Fresh from college in 1968 Farouk had managed to hammer his way up to the then Arab world's most prestigious literary and art publication; Cairo's monthly Al Majallah ('The Magazine') to publish his translation of Paul Klee's lecture in book form on Modern Art in Arabic. The impact was sensational and immediate. Farouk got employment (1968–1977), albeit free lancing, to cover exclusively formative arts' activities in the Egyptian capital's unique evening newspaper; the daily Al Massa ('The Evening'). That is where his second translation of Klee serially appeared; Paul Klee's masterful rendition of the formative tools of creativity in shape and form; Pedagogical Sketchbook. In 1969 Al Majallah published Farouk's translation of 3 articles authored by Henry Moore, a writing rarity by the English landmark sculptor. Another English sculptor and painter; Hubert Dalwood was Farouk's guest in 1974 in an Egyptian Radio show as well as in live appearances in Cairo and Alexandria's Faculty of Fine Arts.

Radio
Farouk's contact with the Egyptian Radio was initiated during the finale of his college undergraduate years. Again it was the translation from English that helped him get through Program 2, a channel dedicated to presenting and discussing classical music, arts, theatre, film, international literature and more. His Arabic translations of short stories by Katherine Mansfield, William Saroyan and Henry James were aired (1967–1969); an effort that led to his employment, in 1974, by Egypt's Radio Authority to join Program 2 as a commentator on arts and film. Farouq had even shown an undercurrent skill in acting out Scott Fitzgerald in a Program 2 radio play written by Farouq.

Farouk returned to write and present film shows on Kuwait Radio (1999–2002) where his Cinema and the World and Comedian were widely received.

Press
Abdul-Aziz's contribution to film criticism, which turned out to be almost the mainstream drive of his career since 1974, started by publishing critique of films produced by 'national cinemas' of the world including Soviet, Hungarian, Egyptian and Arab marginal, as well as US independents. He contributed to editing a book on the Cine Nuevo of Brazil published by The Egyptian Film Critics' Association EFCA in 1975. Farouq's critique writings appeared almost regularly in Cairo Cine-Club's weekly Film Bulletin, the Al Massa daily; the Al Talia (The Avant-Garde) monthly art supplement and aired on Program 2 Radio. A few articles found their way to get published in several Arabic periodicals. By 1977 Farouq had become the film critic for two Kuwait dailies; the Arabic language Al Seyassah ('Politics') and the English language Arab Times. In the following year he joined the Arabic language daily Al Watan ('Homeland') till 1983 and the English language daily The Kuwait Times until 1990. A 4-year stint with the Arabic language daily Al Qabas ('The Torch') followed Al Watan's engagement (1983–1987). He contributed to Britain's Arts & the Islamic World magazine, spring 1985 issue, an article on the status quo and history of media production in Kuwait that eventually appeared in a book published by Kuwait's Ministry of Information in 1986. Farouq's contribution to the pan-Arab popular monthly Al Arabi ('The Arab') and Al Funoon (Arts) of Kuwait, among others, has continued, although intermittently, for over 25 years.

Television
Farouk's TV debut took place when he shared the presentation of Egypt's weekly show Film Archive during the spring season of 1975. He later took over writing and presenting the show by himself. The show hosted many a film personality including the 'revolutionary' Cuban pioneering filmmaker Tomas Gotierrez Alea and the head of the Institute of Cuban Cinema ICAIC. The show had always boasted presenting avant-garde films from several national cinemas including Humberto Solas' Lucia and Alea's Memories of Underdevelopment from Cuba.

The Cine-Club show debuted on Kuwait TV by October 1979 featuring Fred Zinnemann's 1967 period piece A Man for All Seasons. The show, written/produced and presented by Farouq, had scored an immediate popularity in Kuwait and adjacent regions in Southern Iraq and selected countries in the Persian Gulf region. Farouk's list of guests on the show included Vanessa Redgrave, Anthony Quinn among many. The Cine-Club showcased cinemas that were virtually unheard of by the movie crowd in the Persian Gulf; Chinese, German, Swedish, Romanian, Soviet, Italian and French. A select of Hollywood mainstream and independent productions were also introduced. The show kept airing for more than a decade (1979–1992) leaving an indelible impact through its methodical analysis and criticism. A revival of the show took place by 2001 to run for one year on Kuwait TV's free satellite channel.

Kuwait Cine Club

By fall of 1976 Farouk's settlement in Kuwait had marked a welcome resumption of his Egyptian career. The first assignment was to write and produce 3 documentaries in 2 years for the Kuwait Oil Company KOC. During that period Farouk was employed to run the newly founded Kuwait Cine-Club, the first nonprofit cinematic cultural organization to be founded in the Persian Gulf region, a tenure that lasted 16 years (1977–1992). The outcome of the KCC experience had been quite rewarding; the programs devised and executed by Farouk included the organization of more than 60 film festivals and events. National cinemas as well as US and British independents were introduced for the first time in the region and film personalities were invited including Anthony Quinn, Vanessa Redgrave, Mrinal Sen, Shadi Abdussalam, and Yusuf Chahine.

The club's publications of periodicals and festival booklets had certainly helped diffuse film culture in the area as reflected in the Kuwait press and the club's membership rise. Farouk was invited by the Cine-Club's board of directors to become the club's advisor as advertised in several publications including the electronic newspaper Al Aan.

International Film Festival Juror
The Egyptian government's crash on the so-called 'leftist sympathies' by the mid 70s, had resulted in the closure of all 'suspected' publications, all of which were venues for Farouk's work. The hostile move led to the cancellation of Farouq's television and radio shows while he was participating in Baghdad's International Film Festival on Palestine in February 1976. Farouk, representing EFCA, was selected a member of The Arab Film Critics' Circle's jury in this festival where he was interviewed in extreme length and in-depth by Moroccan writer Ahmad Al Medeini for the Al Moharrer (The Editor) daily published in May 1976.

The interview was only the beginning in a series of domestic and international interviews, from Cairo to Kuwait, Baghdad to India, and Britain. Farouq's US press interviews include one conducted by Variety's Gordon Hitchens in July 1981 followed by another Variety feature by Hank Werba who supervised a dossier on TV & Cinema in the Persian Gulf region in February 1982. In 1984 a Los Angeles Times article on Gulf finance and movie making by Jean Brody featured Farouk AbdulAziz highlighting his role in raising awareness about cinematic culture.
Foreign radio interviews include Voice of America of Washington DC in July 1981 and Radio Orient of Paris in 2009.

In April 1980 Farouq was invited to sit on the Jury of the International Short Film Festival in Oberhausen, Germany. The Kurtzfilmtage showcased short features, cartoons as well as documentaries. The event echoed Farouk's juror role in a 1976 edition of Cairo's National Short Feature and Documentary Films' Festival. The Jury roster is highlighted by several Jury jobs as a representative of Egyptian Film Critics Association at the International Federation of Film Critics FIPRESCI panel of the 1984, 1985, and 1987 editions of Cannes Film Festival. In 1995 Farouk had also been invited to join the jury panel of the Ismailia International Short and Documentary Film Festival in Egypt.

Documentary production

Vanessa talks with Farouk Abdulaziz

The third edition of Baghdad Film Festival on Palestine, held in March 1978, was highlighted by the participation of the political actress Vanessa Redgrave. Fresh from Southern Lebanon, she came to a highly politicized film event with Roy Battersby's powerful documentary The Palestinian featuring Vanessa in camps and mountains where the fighters were. Taken by the film's revolutionary output Farouk managed to interview her for Baghdad TV, followed by a press interview for Kuwait's Arab Times. The Arabic version of which has subsequently appeared in the Kuwait's Arabic daily Al Sayassah (Politics). But winning Best Supporting Actress Academy Award (Oscar) of 1978 for her outstanding performance of the title role in Fred Zinnemann's Julia, and the controversy that shrouded her nomination thru the acceptance speech, was the driving force behind going for a full-fledged documentary about Vanessa. Farouk pitched the project to Vanessa who set all elements in place; New Park to produce, Roy Battersby to helm and Chris Menges to shoot (later himself a filmmaker). With the completion of Farouq's script, the project got a head start with Farouq as the on-camera interviewer. Vanessa talks with Farouk Abdulaziz took almost 2 years in the making as Vanessa was busy shooting the CBS film Playing for Time. Father Sir Michael Redgrave gave a special King Lear appearance with Vanessa playing Cordelia in the one-hour documentary.

In her 1991 book Vanessa Redgrave; an Autobiography (Random House/New York) Vanessa talks, among other related incidents, about the circumstances that led to the production of her documentary with Farouk.

The Making Of Omar Mukhtar – Lion Of The Desert
In late 1979 Farouk was hired by US’ Falcon International to write and produce a documentary on the making of the company's Hollywood major feature film; Lion of the Desert. The mega million dollar movie was produced and directed by Mustapha Akkad, with an all Academy Award winner cast and crew. Farouk wrote the script and conducted the interviews with Anthony Quinn, Rod Steiger, Oliver Reed and Jack Hildyard in addition to the Producer/Director Akkad. Two original versions in Arabic and English came out upon the film's release in 1981.

NHK and other ventures
The liaison with NHK, Japanese TV started after the release of Farouk's production of the Arabic version of the Swiss production and sales consortium Telepool's The Great National Parks of Europe. Farouq was commissioned in 1987 to produce the international version of NHK's 18-hour The Silk Road. Farouk ended up co-writing the series (segments related to the Islamic world) and directing the English version for a worldwide release including England's ITV and Canada's History Channel.

The following year Farouk had received yet another commissioning from Turkey's Ministry of Culture to write, produce and direct the 35 minute documentary Merhaba, a visual rendition of Turkey's historical and cultural fresco.

The first Gulf War got Farouk involved in researching and producing stories to serve many a client including BBC, Channel 4, CBS and NBC for a period of 7 months after the liberation of Kuwait in February 1991. In the same period Farouq researched and produced the Kuwait segment of Mark Magidson's 70 mm production of Ron Fricke's film Baraka, a non-verbal feature film.

In the mid 90s Farouk was busy developing and pitching his first feature film venture Love in Exile. The project was set for a co-production deal with the Irish production entity Meem Productions, with Farouq writing and helming. It had been announced during the 1996 edition of Cannes Film Festival in the 17 May Cannes issues of The Moving Picture and Screen International. The project didn't take off though.

Religion vs science
By April 2008 Farouk kicked off the production of two documentaries in two original versions exploring the interaction of Holy Scriptures with science; a job that took almost 2 years. Maurice and the Pharaoh and From Microcosm to Macrocosm were released in spring 2010. On January 10, 2011 'Maurice and the Pharaoh' and From Microcosm to Macrocosm were awarded the Sheikh Fahad Al Ahmad International Award for Charity for 'the distinguished creativity in sending a humanitarian message'. Both works received funding from Kuwait's Nasser Abdul-Mohsen Al Sa'eed Charitable Third.

A third documentary, Gates of Heaven, probing another area in this topic is released in spring 2012. As further research in this area expanded, five more documentaries were produced and released in October 2012 on the internet to a great reception.  According to YouTube stats a record viewership number (given the scientific/cultural content of the material) is registered in a week's time 37504. The Great Split examines the Big Bang Theory; The Expanding Universe explores the acceleration of the process, The Hobok: The Cosmic Web gives a detailed account of the structure and texture of the universe as described in one Qur'anic word. Signs and Voices tells a few stories of a select group recounting the impact the scientific signs in the Qur'an had left on them. Finally In its Orbit explains how the concepts of Earth's roundness and just being a planet in the universe not at the center of it are singled out in the Qur'an 1400 years ago. The films are funded by Bodoor Charity of Kuwait.

Animated films
Farouk was commissioned by LA's Cartoon and Animation Center (1998–2000) to write 3 animated feature – length films. Farouk had also advised the center on production while producing the Arabic version, in Syria's Zahra' Studio, of the center's feature Knights of Virtue. The animated film The Return of the Golden Queen, based on Farouq's story, was released in original English and Arabic versions in 2000.

Adviser
During the 80s Farouk had been advising Kuwait's ministers of information as to the implementation of foreign cultural protocols especially the film related events. He contributed to Britain's Arts & the Islamic World magazine, spring 1985 issue, an article on the status quo and history of media production in Kuwait that eventually appeared in a book published by Kuwait's ministry of Information in 1986. The advisory job was revived by the late 90s thru 2010. During that period Farouq advised several Kuwait government bodies on media affairs. For those bodies Farouk was commissioned to produce several documentaries and TV shows including Islamic Art; a View from the Bridge (1999), The Imprint of the Soul (2000), Love Letters (2000), Love thyself – 11 episodes (2001), The Last Prophet (2005), To Be or Not to Be (2006), Barirah (2007) and Islamic Art; Legacy of a Nation (2009).

References

External links
 
 http://bucaillelegacy.com/FarouqAbdulAziz.html
 https://web.archive.org/web/20130704025318/http://thegatesofheaven.net/
 https://web.archive.org/web/20130805220255/http://www.ejazsignsquran.com/

1946 births
Egyptian animators
Egyptian film producers
Egyptian animated film directors
Egyptian animated film producers
Egyptian journalists
Egyptian television presenters
Egyptian writers
Living people
People from El Mahalla El Kubra